The  is a vision  skyscraper building intended for Tokyo, Japan.

The design of the tower is part of an initiative called Next Tokyo 2045 for research and developmental purposes and was made by Kohn Pedersen Fox Associates and Leslie E. Robertson Associates.

The Sky Mile Tower would be built on an archipelago of reclaimed land in Tokyo Bay. This proposed reclamation project with the Sky Mile Tower as its centrepiece is dubbed as "Next Tokyo".

Representatives from Next Tokyo believe the value of new waterfront properties in Tokyo Bay could help pay for the project's construction, should the proposal go through.

See also 
 List of buildings with 100 floors or more
 List of future tallest buildings
 Sky City 1000
 Proposed tall buildings and structures

References 

 Proposed skyscrapers in Japan